2021–22 Calcutta Women's Football League was the 26th season of the Calcutta Women's Football League, also known as the Kanyashree Cup. SSB Women's won their fourth title in the ediiton and qualified for the 2021–22 Indian Women's League.

Teams

Group A

Matches

Group B

Matches

Group C

Matches

Group D

Matches

Quarterfinals

Semifinals

Finals

Season awards
The following awards were announced at the end of the season:

 Player of the Tournament: Dular Marandi (SSB Women FC)
 Highest Goalscorer: Mina Khatun (Southern Samity)
 Best Goalkeeper: Rani Bhowmick (Kalighat Sports Lovers Assn)

References 

2021–22 in Indian football leagues
2021–22 domestic women's association football leagues